Gyula Szersén (22 November 1940 – 17 March 2021) was a Hungarian film, television and voice actor.

References 

1940 births
2021 deaths
Hungarian male film actors
Hungarian male television actors
Hungarian male voice actors